Alvin Tan Sheng Hui (born 1980) is a Singaporean politician who has been serving as Minister of State for Trade and Industry and Minister of State for Culture, Community and Youth concurrently since 2020. A member of the governing People's Action Party (PAP), he has been the Member of Parliament (MP) representing the Moulmein–Cairnhill division of Tanjong Pagar GRC since 2020.

Prior to entering politics, Tan had worked at various organisations, including the Ministry of Defence (MINDEF), Oxfam, United Nations, Goldman Sachs, Facebook and LinkedIn. 

He made his political debut in the 2020 general election as part of a five-member PAP team contesting in Tanjong Pagar GRC and won 63.13% of the vote.

Education
Tan attended the Anglo-Chinese School (Independent) and Anglo-Chinese Junior College before graduating from the University of Sydney with a Bachelor of Economics with first class honours degree under a scholarship conferred by the Singapore Armed Forces (SAF). 

He subsequently went on to complete a Master of Public Policy degree at Harvard University's John F. Kennedy School of Government. 

He also received the 2008 Tan Kah Kee Foundation Postgraduate Scholarship and the International and Global Affairs Fellowship from the Belfer Center for Science and International Affairs at Harvard University.

Career
Tan had worked in the private, public and non-profit sectors at various organisations, including the Ministry of Defence (MINDEF), Oxfam and the United Nations (UN). He worked in the investment banking sector at Goldman Sachs in Singapore and Hong Kong between 2010 and 2015. He was also Head of Public Policy, Trust and Safety at Facebook and Head of Public Policy and Economics for the Asia-Pacific region at LinkedIn.

Political career
Tan made his political debut in the 2020 general election as part of a five-member PAP team contesting in Tanjong Pagar GRC and won 63.13% of the vote against the opposition Progress Singapore Party. 

Prior to that, he had been a community volunteer at Kreta Ayer–Kim Seng since 2005 and at Moulmein–Cairnhill since 2019, and had worked with Lily Neo, the Member of Parliament (MP) representing Kreta Ayer–Kim Seng between 1997 and 2020.

After the 2020 general election, Tan was elected as the Member of Parliament (MP) representing the Moulmein–Cairnhill ward of Tanjong Pagar GRC. 

On 1 September 2020, Tan was appointed as Minister of State for Culture, Community and Youth and Minister of State for Trade and Industry.

Personal life 
Tan is married with two children.

References 

1980 births
Living people
Anglo-Chinese School alumni
Anglo-Chinese Junior College alumni
University of Sydney alumni
Harvard Kennedy School alumni
People's Action Party politicians
Members of the Parliament of Singapore